This discography is a comprehensive listing of official releases by British soul singer Beverley Knight. It consists of eight studio albums, three compilation albums (two greatest hits albums and one remix album) and one EP. Knight has also released twenty-eight solo singles (excluding re-releases) and twenty-six solo music videos. She has also collaborated on at least fifteen other projects.

Albums

Studio albums

Collaborative albums

Compilation albums

Live albums

Remix albums

Soundtrack albums

Extended plays

Singles

Collaborations

Music videos

Solo

Collaborations

Cameo appearances

References

Discography
Discographies of British artists
Rhythm and blues discographies
Soul music discographies